The following is a list of national radio stations broadcast in Italy.

See also 
 List of radio stations in Turin
 List of radio stations in Rome
 List of radio stations in Naples
 List of Italian-language radio stations
 Emittenti radiofoniche italiane in onde medie
 Media of Italy
 List of newspapers in Italy
 List of magazines published in Italy
 Television in Italy
 List of television channels in Italy
 
 Censorship in Italy
 Telecommunications in Italy
 Internet in Italy